Pascual Sisto (born 1975, Ferrol, Spain) is a Spanish filmmaker and visual artist. His works were exhibited in international galleries and museums, such as the Pompidou Center, the MAK Center for Art and Architecture, the Istanbul Museum of Modern Art and the 53rd Venice Biennale.

John and the Hole, the film that marks his directorial debut, was selected for the Cannes 2020 and Sundance 2021 festivals. Sisto was named by Variety as one of the ten directors to watch in 2021.

Biography and career

Education 
Sisto graduated from ArtCenter College of Design in Pasadena, California, where he obtained a BFA (Bachelor of Fine Arts). In Los Angeles, he obtained a master's degree in media arts from the University of California. Sisto also attended the Skowhegan School of Painting and Sculpture in 2011, and received grants from the California Community Foundation Emerging Artist in 2012, ARC Durfee Foundation in 2011 and NYSCA in 2017, NYFA Artist Fellowship in Digital and Electronic Arts. In 2017 he was awarded a residency in Visual Arts at Pioneer Works in Brooklyn, and in 2019 he won the Artistic Residence of the Lower Manhattan Cultural Council Workspace.

Career 
In 2003, due to the short film Océano, in which he worked as an executive producer and screenwriter, Sisto won the Kodak Vision Award at the Rhode Island International Film Festival. In 2009, he presented his art exhibitions at the Istanbul Museum of Modern Art and at the 53rd Venice Biennale. In 2010, he was one of the artists selected by the Department of Cultural Affairs and LAX to create a permanent exhibition at the Tom Bradley International Terminal.

His art exhibitions have already been reviewed by Art in America, Flash Art, Los Angeles Times and Vice.

In October 2019, Sisto started recording the feature film that marks his directorial debut, John and the Hole, which was written by Nicolás Giacobone. John and the Hole was selected for the Cannes 2020 and Sundance 2021 festivals, and placed Sisto on Variety's list of ten directors to watch in 2021. In January 2021, the movie appears on TheWrap, Screen Daily, Hollywood Reporter, Deadline and IndieWire's lists of the most anticipated films at the Sundance Film Festival. John and the Hole also appeared on GQs (Mexico), Vogue's (which was reported in Italy and the United States).

 Filmography 

 Films 
 2003:  Océano  (short film, director and screenwriter)
 2021:  John and the Hole  (director)

 Television 
 2017:  Steps  (codirector, producer and executive producer)

 Award 

 References 

 External links 
 
 
 Exhibition history at Brand New Gallery''

Art Center College of Design alumni
University of California alumni
Spanish artists
Spanish television directors
Spanish cinematographers
Spanish screenwriters
Spanish film producers
1975 births
Living people